Gavork-e Sardasht Rural District is in the Central District of Sardasht County, West Azerbaijan province, Iran. At the National Census of 2006, its population was 5,316 in 887 households. There were 4,137 inhabitants in 1,032 households at the following census of 2011. At the most recent census of 2016, the population of the rural district was 3,364 in 766 households. The largest of its 31 villages was Si Sar, with 641 people.

References 

Sardasht County

Rural Districts of West Azerbaijan Province

Populated places in West Azerbaijan Province

Populated places in Sardasht County